Bettinger may refer to:

Claude Bettinger sculptor and stained glass artist
Franziskus von Bettinger, Archbishop of Munich
Stephen L. Bettinger, Korean War flying ace
Walt Bettinger, CEO of Charles Schwab Corporation